Magdalena Crispin Shauri (born 25 February 1996) is a Tanzanian long distance runner. She competed in the women's marathon at the 2017 World Championships in Athletics. In 2019, she competed in the senior women's race at the 2019 IAAF World Cross Country Championships. She finished in 49th place.

References

External links

1996 births
Living people
Tanzanian female long-distance runners
Tanzanian female marathon runners
World Athletics Championships athletes for Tanzania
Place of birth missing (living people)